The 1938 World Archery Championships was the 8th edition of the event. It was held in London, Great Britain on 8–13 August 1938 and was organised by World Archery Federation (FITA).

In the women's individual competition, Nora Weston-Martyr and Louise Nettleton finished with equal scores and are considered co-champions by FITA.

Medals summary

Recurve

Medals table

References

External links
 World Archery website
 Complete results

World Championship
World Archery
Arch
World Archery Championships
World Archery Championship
World Archery Championship
International archery competitions hosted by the United Kingdom